The cuneiform šu sign is a common, multi-use syllabic and alphabetic sign for šu, š, and u; it has a subsidiary usage for syllabic qat; it also has a majuscule-(capital letter) Sumerogram usage for ŠU, for Akkadian language "qātu", the word for "hand". The human hand is the shape of cuneiform character šu, and thus the origin of its creation (late 4th millennium BC, or early 3rd millennium BC).

The scribal usage of a sign allows for any of the 4 vowels (no vowel 'o' in Akkadian), a, e, i, u to be interchangeable; thus a usage for syllabic qat could conceivably be used for the following (k can replace 'q', and d can replace 't'): q, a, or t; also ka, qa, ad, at. (The "š" (shibilant s) is also interchangeable with the other two esses, "s", and "ṣ", for "šu"!)

The šu sign has a common usage in the Amarna letters and the Epic of Gilgamesh. Its usage numbers in the Epic are as follows: qat-(16), šu-(420), ŠU-(13).

References

Moran, William L. 1987, 1992. The Amarna Letters. Johns Hopkins University Press, 1987, 1992. 393 pages.(softcover)
 Parpola, 1971. The Standard Babylonian Epic of Gilgamesh, Parpola, Simo, Neo-Assyrian Text Corpus Project, c 1997, Tablet I thru Tablet XII, Index of Names, Sign List, and Glossary-(pp. 119–145), 165 pages.

Cuneiform signs